Thorleifs jul is a 1998 Thorleifs Christmas album. The album was recorded inside the Strängnäs Cathedral for TV4 Vision, and peaked at 45th position on the Swedish albums chart.

Track listing
Jul, jul, strålande jul
Nu tändas tusen juleljus
Gläns över sjö och strand
O helga natt (Cantique de noël)
Låt mig få tända ett ljus (Schlafe mein Prinzchen)
Gemenskapens jul
Jag drömmer om en jul hemma (White Christmas)
När det lider mot jul (Det strålar en stjärna)
Ser du stjärnan i det blå (When You Wish upon a Star)
Julen är nära
När juldagsmorgon glimmar
Stilla natt (Stille Nacht, heilige Nacht)
Ett barn är fött på denna dag

Charts

References 

1998 Christmas albums
Thorleifs albums
Christmas albums by Swedish artists
Swedish-language albums